An aid agency, also known as development charity, is an organization dedicated to distributing aid. Many professional aid organisations exist, both within government, between governments as multilateral donors and as private voluntary organizations or non-governmental organisations. The International Committee of the Red Cross is the world’s second oldest humanitarian organisation and is unique in being mandated by international treaty to uphold the Geneva Conventions. The Sovereign Order of Malta, established in 1099 as the Order of St. John of Jerusalem, has an unbroken tradition of over 900 years of hospitaller activities, continuing to this day. Even in its modern guise under international law, it was recognized at the Congress of Verona of 1822, and since 1834 headquartered in Palazzo Malta in Rome, decades before the Red Cross.

Aid can be subdivided into two categories: humanitarian aid (emergency relief efforts, e.g. in response to natural disasters), and development aid (or foreign aid), aimed at helping countries to achieve long-term sustainable economic growth, with the aim of achieving poverty reduction. Some aid agencies carry out both kinds of aid, whilst others specialise on one aspect.

With a lack of oversight within the
Charity realm, there are  
Non-development assistance committees, and development assistance committees. Within the last few decades DACs have been the main character in the research on the charity's effectiveness. Through vigorous study we will be looking into both forms of charity and there effectiveness based on five factors.( transparency, overhead costs, aid specialization, selective allocation, and effective delivery channels) to see which form of the committee is most effective.  (Dreher & Fuchs, 2015;) explain that both companies apply most aid to their country of origin. Although DAC agencies have more refined and easy obtain records showing their reporting and the lowest overhead costs, they engage in much worse effective aid practices in the remaining four factors.( Brech & Potrafke, 2014; Dreher et al., 2009; Fleck & Kilby, 2010; Frot et al., 2014; Fuchs et al., 2014; Kuziemko & Werker, 2006; Maizels & Nissanke, 1984; Neumayer, 2003). All in all, both DAC and Non-DAC have flaws; neither is clean from government pressure and lobbyist money ( Roodman (2004), Knack (2001). With further research on donor failure when it comes to meeting YoY standards we can find whether or not donors give because of self-interest

See also
 Charitable organization
 Cryptocurrency donation
 Development bank
 Effective altruism
 List of development aid agencies

References

External links

 Foreign Relations and International Aid resources from University of Colorado–Boulder
 
 AidData - a web portal for information on development aid, including a database of aid activities financed by donors worldwide
 EuropeAid Cooperation Office
 OECD Development Co-operation Directorate (DAC)
 Foreign Aid at Brookings Institution
 How Food Aid Work.
 Foreign Aid Projects 1955-2010

Aid
 
International development agencies